Piotr Gabrych (born ) is a former Polish male volleyball player. He was part of the Poland men's national volleyball team. He competed with the national team at the 2004 Summer Olympics in Athens, Greece. He played with Jastrzębski Węgiel in 2004.

Clubs
  Jastrzębski Węgiel (2004)

See also
 Poland at the 2004 Summer Olympics

References

1972 births
Living people
Polish men's volleyball players
Place of birth missing (living people)
Volleyball players at the 2004 Summer Olympics
Olympic volleyball players of Poland
Czarni Radom players
Jastrzębski Węgiel players
Resovia (volleyball) players